The 2011 KHL Junior Draft was the third entry draft held by the Kontinental Hockey League (KHL), taking place on 28 May 2011 in Mytishchi Arena. Ice hockey players from around the world aged between 17 and 21 years of age were selected. Players eligible to take part in the draft were required to not have an active contract with a KHL, MHL or VHL team. A total of 371 players participated in the draft, 171 of these playing in Russia, 100 in Europe and 100 in North America.

Top prospects

Notes:

1. The KHL considers European players as being European-born players not born in Russia, regardless of their current team.

Selections by round

Round one

Round 2

Round 3

Round 4

Round 5

Round 6

References

See also

KHL territorial pick

Kontinental Hockey League Junior Draft
Junior Draft